The Beautiful Plains School Division is a rural school Division in Manitoba, Canada, with two major centers in Neepawa and Carberry. The division office is located in Neepawa. It is overseen by a board of 7 elected trustees.

Beautiful Plains School Division is responsible for several public schools as well as several Hutterite colony schools.

Schools in Beautiful Plains School Division

See also
List of school districts in Manitoba

External links 
 Beautiful Plains School Division Website

School districts in Manitoba